Eliyahu Lopian (1876 – 21 September 1970), known as Reb Elyah, was a rabbi of the Mussar Movement.

Biography 
Lopian was born in Grajewo, Poland in 1876 and studied at the yeshiva in Łomża and at the Kelm Talmud Torah of Simcha Zissel Ziv. He emigrated to England in 1928, where he was the rosh yeshiva of the Etz Chaim Yeshiva in the East End of London, working for many years alongside Nachman Shlomo Greenspan. His wife Soroh Leah Rotman died in 1934, shortly after the engagement of their daughter Lieba to Leib Gurwicz.

In 1950 he left the Etz Chaim Yeshiva and immigrated to Israel where he taught and was Mashgiach Ruchani at the Knesses Chizkiyahu yeshiva located in Zikhron Ya'akov and later Kfar Hasidim).

He died in Israel on 21 September 1970, and was buried in the Mount of Olives Jewish Cemetery.

He had 13 children. After his death a street was named in his honor in the Ramat Shlomo neighborhood of Jerusalem.

His work Lev Eliyahu was edited by his students.

References 

 Reb Elyah: The Life and Accomplishments of Rabbi Elyah Lopian, David J. Schlossberg, Mesorah Publications Limited, February 1999.

External links 
 Lectures given by Reb Elyah Lopian in Yiddish: iawaken.org

1876 births
1970 deaths
Burials at the Jewish cemetery on the Mount of Olives
Polish Haredi rabbis
Haredi rabbis in Israel
20th-century English rabbis
Mashgiach ruchani
Rosh yeshivas
Rabbis from London
English Orthodox Jews
20th-century Israeli rabbis
People from Grajewo
Polish Orthodox Jews